C22 is a secondary route in Namibia that exists in two discontinuous sections: a southern section running from Aranos to Gobabis, and a northern section running from Okondjatu to Otjiwarongo.  The section between Gobabis and Okondjatu, formerly part of the C22, is now part of the B14.

References

Roads in Namibia